Cui Lin (born 26 October 1997) is a Chinese footballer who currently plays for Hebei China Fortune in the Chinese Super League. His twin elder brother Cui Qi is also a footballer.

Club career
Cui Lin moved aboard in 2013 and joined Campeonato de Portugal side Loures. He was promoted to the first team in the summer of 2016. He made his senior debut on 28 August 2016, playing the whole match in a 2–1 away win against Real S.C. On 19 February 2017, he scored his first senior goal in a 5–1 away win over Fabril Barreiro.

On 28 February 2018, Cui transferred to Chinese Super League side Hebei China Fortune. On 24 April 2018, he made his debut for the club in a 4–0 away win over Suzhou Dongwu in the 2018 Chinese FA Cup, coming on as a substitute for Zhao Mingjian at the half time. He made his Super League debut four days later on 28 April 2018 in a 3–0 away win over Tianjin Quanjian, coming on for Xu Tianyuan at the 85th minute.

Career statistics
.

References

External links
 

1997 births
Living people
Chinese footballers
Footballers from Liaoning
People from Fushun
GS Loures players
Hebei F.C. players
Segunda Divisão players
Chinese Super League players
Association football defenders
Chinese expatriate footballers
Expatriate footballers in Portugal
Chinese expatriate sportspeople in Portugal
Twin sportspeople
Chinese twins